The men's rugby sevens tournament at the 2016 Summer Olympics was held in Brazil. It was hosted at the Deodoro Stadium, a temporary outdoor stadium constructed as part of the Deodoro Modern Pentathlon Park in Rio de Janeiro. The tournament was held from 9 August to 11 August 2016, starting with group matches before finishing with the medal ceremony on 11 August. The 2016 Games marked the first time that rugby sevens has been played at the Olympics, and the first time since 1924 that any form of rugby had been played at the Olympics.

The gold medal for Fiji represented the first Olympic medal earned by Fiji at any Olympics. Great Britain won silver and South Africa defeated Japan to win the bronze medal.

Qualification
With Brazil being the hosts, their team automatically qualified despite their sevens team not regularly appearing in the World Rugby Sevens Series. The 2014–15 Sevens World Series was the initial stage of qualification, with the top 4 teams at the end of the series gaining qualification to the 2016 Olympic Games. Between June and September 2015, each of the six regional rugby unions held an Olympic qualification event, where one team from each region qualified, bringing the total up to 11 teams qualified. The final spot was determined by a repechage tournament held in Monaco, where the winner of that event became the final team to qualify for the 2016 Olympic Games.

As a result of England finishing fourth in the 2014–15 Sevens World Series, Great Britain were awarded a spot in the Olympic Games, despite the other nations failing to qualify in the top 4. This is because Great Britain compete as one union in the Olympics and as several in international rugby (Rugby Football Union for England, Welsh Rugby Union, Scottish Rugby Union and the combined Irish Rugby Football Union for Northern Ireland and the Republic of Ireland), which meant should one of either the England, Wales or Scotland teams qualify, then Great Britain would be awarded a spot in the Olympic Games. It was decided players based in Northern Ireland were not eligible to represent Great Britain in the rugby sevens tournament as these players represent the IRFU, and the union demanded that Northern Irish players that have committed to play for the Irish rugby union, only play for Ireland despite being eligible under IOC rules to compete for Great Britain. The three remaining unions agreed in advance of the 2013–14 Sevens World Series that their highest-finishing teams in that season would represent all three unions in the first stage of qualification.

Qualified teams

Squads

Draw
The draw for the tournament took place on 28 June 2016. The 12 teams were seeded based on their points they have accumulated over the past two seasons on the Sevens Series circuit. The four teams that qualified directly from the 2014–15 Sevens World Series were guaranteed a top four seeding, with their positioning determined by their combined score over the two seasons.

Competition schedule
The men's rugby tournament takes place over three days:

Match officials
World Rugby announced a panel of twelve match officials on 11 April 2016 for the men's sevens. Two Brazilians were later added as assistant referees.

 Mike Adamson (Great Britain)
 Federico Anselmi (Argentina)
 Nick Briant (New Zealand)
 Ben Crouse (South Africa)
 Craig Joubert (South Africa)
 Richard Kelly (New Zealand)
 Anthony Moyes (Australia)
 Matthew O'Brien (Australia)
 Taku Otsuki (Japan)
 Rasta Rasivhenge (South Africa)
 Alexandre Ruiz (France)
 Marius van der Westhuizen (South Africa)
 Henrique Platais (Brazil) – Assistant referee
 Ricardo Sant'Anna (Brazil) – Assistant referee

Pool stage
In pool play, each team plays one match against the other three teams in the group. Three points are awarded for a win, two points - for a draw, and one point - for a loss.

Group winners and runners-up advance to the quarter-finals. Third place teams drop to a third-placed teams table, where the top two third placed teams advance to the quarter-finals. Rankings are based on competition points; if teams are tied, the next tiebreaker is points difference.

Pool A

Pool B

Pool C

Ranking of third-placed teams
The top two of the third-placed teams advance to the knockout rounds.

Knockout stage
The quarterfinals were scheduled for August 10, with the semifinals and finals scheduled for August 11.

9–12th place playoff

Semi-finals

11th Place

9th Place Final

5–8th place playoff

Semi-finals

Seventh Place

Fifth Place Final

Medal playoff

Quarter-finals

Semi-finals

Bronze-medal match

Gold-medal match

Final ranking

Player statistics

Try scorers
6 tries
 Carlin Isles

5 tries

 Josua Tuisova
 Billy Odhiambo
 Cecil Afrika

4 tries

 Matías Moroni
 Tom Cusack
 Osea Kolinisau
 Terry Bouhraoua
 Dan Norton
 Lomano Lemeki
 Akira Ioane
 Rosko Specman
 Marcos Poggi
 Danny Barrett

3 tries

 Gastón Revol
 Jesse Parahi
 Vatemo Ravouvou
 Jerry Tuwai
 Jasa Veremalua
 Dan Bibby
 Teruya Goto
 Rieko Ioane
 Regan Ware
 Kyle Brown
 Seabelo Senatla

2 tries

 Santiago Álvarez
 Axel Müller
 Con Foley
 Ed Jenkins
 Semi Kunatani
 Viliame Mata
 Kitione Taliga
 Damien Cler
 Stephen Parez
 Virimi Vakatawa
 Mark Bennett
 James Rodwell
 Kazuhiro Goya
 Collins Injera
 Lewis Ormond
 Justin Geduld
 Nate Ebner
 Maka Unufe

1 try

 Nicolás Bruzzone
 Pablo Fontes
 Juan Imhoff
 Ángel López
 Fernando Luna
 Franco Sábato
 Germán Schulz
 Cameron Clark
 Henry Hutchison
 John Porch
 Gustavo Albuquerque
 Laurent Bourda-Couhet
 Felipe Claro
 Daniel Sancery
 Leone Nakarawa
 Samisoni Viriviri
 Jérémy Aicardi
 Julien Candelon
 Manoël Dall'igna
 Sacha Valleau
 Phil Burgess
 James Davies
 Marcus Watson
 Kazushi Hano
 Yusaku Kuwazuru
 Katsuyuki Sakai
 Kameli Soejima
 Lote Tuqiri
 Willy Ambaka
 Andrew Amonde
 Scott Curry
 Gillies Kaka
 Tim Mikkelson
 Augustine Pulu
 Juan de Jongh
 Cheslin Kolbe
 Dylan Sage
 Kwagga Smith
 Philip Snyman
 César Sempere
 Perry Baker
 Folau Niua

Point scorers
43 points
 Terry Bouhraoua

42 points
 Cecil Afrika

38 points
 Osea Kolinisau

37 points
 Gastón Revol

30 points
 Carlin Isles

25 points

 Vatemo Ravouvou
 Josua Tuisova
 Billy Odhiambo

22 points

 Kazuhiro Goya
 Lomano Lemeki

20 points

 Matías Moroni
 Tom Cusack
 Tom Mitchell
 Dan Norton
 Akira Ioane
 Seabelo Senatla
 Roscko Speckman
 Marcos Poggi
 Danny Barrett
 Madison Hughes

19 points
 Gillies Kaka

15 points

 Jesse Parahi
 Jerry Tuwai
 Jasa Veremalua
 Dan Bibby
 Teruya Goto
 Rieko Ioane
 Regan Ware
 Kyle Brown

14 points
 Justin Geduld

13 points
 Augustine Pulu

12 points

 James Stannard
 Kitione Taliga

11 points
 Katsuyuki Sakai

10 points

 Santiago Álvarez
 Axel Müller
 Con Foley
 Ed Jenkins
 Semi Kunatani
 Viliame Mata
 Damien Cler
 Stephen Parez
 Virimi Vakatawa
 Mark Bennett
 James Rodwell
 Collins Injera
 Lewis Ormond
 Nate Ebner
 Maka Unufe

8 points
 Francisco Hernández

7 points
 Marcus Watson

6 points

 James Stannard
 Samuel Oliech

5 points

 Nicolás Bruzzone
 Pablo Fontes
 Juan Imhoff
 Ángel López
 Fernando Luna
 Franco Sábato
 Germán Schulz
 Cameron Clark
 Henry Hutchison
 John Porch
 Gustavo Albuquerque
 Laurent Bourda-Couhet
 Felipe Claro
 Daniel Sancery
 Leone Nakarawa
 Samisoni Viriviri
 Jérémy Aicardi
 Julien Candelon
 Manoël Dall'igna
 Sacha Valleau
 Phil Burgess
 James Davies
 Kazushi Hano
 Yusaku Kuwazuru
 Kameli Soejima
 Lote Tuqiri
 Willy Ambaka
 Andrew Amonde
 Scott Curry
 Tim Mikkelson
 Juan de Jongh
 Cheslin Kolbe
 Dylan Sage
 Kwagga Smith
 Philip Snyman
 César Sempere
 Perry Baker
 Folau Niua

4 points
 Biko Adema

2 points

 Lucas Duque
 André Silva
 Vincent Inigo
 Chris Wyles

See also
Rugby sevens at the 2016 Summer Olympics – Women's tournament

References

External links
Official website

 
Rugby sevens at the 2016 Summer Olympics